Vorly is a commune in the Cher department in the Centre-Val de Loire region of France.

Geography

Population

Sights
 The church of St. Saturnin, dating from the fifteenth century.
 The fourteenth-century chateau of Bois-Sir-Amé.
 A feudal motte.

See also
Communes of the Cher department

References

Communes of Cher (department)